Emile Severeyns (28 August 1931 – 30 November 1979) was a Belgian road and track cyclist. Professional from 1953 to 1971, he won 26 six-day races. He also competed in the 1954 Giro d'Italia and the 1956 Vuelta a España.

Major results

Track

1955
 1st Six Days of Brussels (with Rik Van Steenbergen)
 1st Six Days of Ghent (with Rik Van Steenbergen)
1956
 1st Six Days of Dortmund (with Rik Van Steenbergen)
 1st Six Days of Brussels (with Rik Van Steenbergen)
 2nd Six Days of Antwerp (with Arsène Rijckaert and Rik Van Steenbergen)
 2nd Six Days of Ghent (with Rik Van Steenbergen)
1957
 1st Six Days of Berlin (with Rik Van Steenbergen)
 2nd Six Days of Zurich (with Rik Van Steenbergen)
 3rd Six Days of Antwerp (with Rik Van Steenbergen and Willy Vannitsen)
 3rd Six Days of Brussels (with Rik Van Steenbergen)
1958
 1st  Madison, European Track Championships (with Rik Van Steenbergen)
 1st Six Days of Antwerp (with Rik Van Steenbergen and Reginald Arnold)
 1st Six Days of Brussels (with Rik Van Steenbergen)
 1st Six Days of Copenhagen (with Rik Van Steenbergen)
 1st Six Days of Frankfurt (with Rik Van Steenbergen)
 2nd Six Days of Ghent (with Rik Van Steenbergen)
 2nd Six Days of Zurich (with Rik Van Steenbergen)
 2nd Six Days of Berlin (with Rik Van Steenbergen)
1959
 1st  Madison, European Track Championships (with Rik Van Steenbergen)
 1st Six Days of Zurich (with Rik Van Steenbergen)
 2nd Six Days of Brussels (with Rik Van Steenbergen)
 2nd Six Days of Copenhagen (with Rik Van Steenbergen)
 2nd Six Days of Berlin (with Rik Van Steenbergen)
 3rd Six Days of Antwerp (with Rik Van Steenbergen)
1960
 1st  Madison, European Track Championships (with Rik Van Steenbergen)
 1st Six Days of Aarhus (with Rik Van Steenbergen)
 1st Six Days of Brussels (with Rik Van Steenbergen)
 1st Six Days of Copenhagen (with Rik Van Steenbergen)
 2nd Six Days of Antwerp (with Leo Proost and Rik Van Steenbergen)
 2nd Six Days of Ghent (with Rik Van Steenbergen)
1961
 1st  Madison, European Track Championships (with Rik Van Steenbergen)
 1st  Madison, National Track Championships (with Rik Van Steenbergen)
 1st Six Days of Zurich (with Rik Van Steenbergen)
 1st Six Days of Dortmund (with Rik Van Steenbergen)
 2nd Six Days of Cologne (with Rik Van Steenbergen)
 2nd Six Days of Ghent (with Rik Van Steenbergen)
 2nd Six Days of Brussels (with Rik Van Steenbergen)
 2nd Six Days of Antwerp (with Gilbert Maes and Rik Van Steenbergen)
 3rd Six Days of Aarhus (with Rik Van Steenbergen)
 3rd Six Days of Berlin (with Rik Van Steenbergen)
1962
 1st  Madison, National Track Championships (with Rik Van Steenbergen)
 1st Six Days of Zurich (with Rik Van Steenbergen)
 1st Six Days of Cologne (with Rik Van Steenbergen)
 1st Six Days of Milan (with Rik Van Steenbergen)
 2nd Six Days of Antwerp (with Palle Lykke and Rik Van Steenbergen)
 3rd  Madison, European Track Championships (with Rik Van Steenbergen)
 3rd Six Days of Berlin I (with Rik Van Steenbergen)
 3rd Six Days of Berlin II (with Rik Van Steenbergen)
 3rd Six Days of Brussels (with Emile Daems)
1963
 3rd  Madison, European Track Championships (with Reginald Arnold)
1964
 1st Six Days of Montreal (with Palle Lykke)
 1st Six Days of Quebec (with Lucien Gillen)
 2nd Madison, National Track Championships (with Rik Van Steenbergen)
 2nd Six Days of Zurich (with Rik Van Steenbergen)
1965
 1st Six Days of Toronto (with Rik Van Steenbergen)
 1st Six Days of Quebec (with Rik Van Steenbergen)
 2nd  Madison, European Track Championships (with Rik Van Steenbergen)
 3rd Six Days of Ghent (with Rik Van Steenbergen)
1966
 1st Six Days of Madrid (with Walter Godefroot)
 1st Six Days of Montreal II (with Palle Lykke)
 3rd Madison, National Track Championships (with Robert Lelangue)
1967
 1st Six Days of Montreal I (with Patrick Sercu)
 2nd Madison, National Track Championships (with Gilbert Maes)
 3rd Six Days of Antwerp (with Leo Proost and Tom Simpson)
1968
 1st Six Days of Antwerp (with Sigi Renz and Theo Verschueren)

Road
1953
 1st GP Briek Schotte
1956
 1st Heist-op-den-Berg
1957
 1st GP Briek Schotte
1962
 1st Elfstedenronde

References

External links

1931 births
1979 deaths
Belgian male cyclists
Belgian track cyclists
People from Schoten
Cyclists from Antwerp Province